Gérard Locardi (15 April 1915 in Paris – 12 April 1998 in Marseille) was a French painter.

In the Académie de la Grande Chaumière in Paris, he has been student of Othon Friesz and Édouard Georges Mac-Avoy for the painting and Despiau for sculpture.

He has been mainly a painter who found his inspiration in antique themes, two of his paintings are exhibited in the Chapelle de la Charité in Carpentras, Provence.

References

Painters from Paris
1915 births
1998 deaths
Modern painters
20th-century French painters
20th-century French male artists
French male painters